Dulenjan-e Peyvandi may refer to:
 Dulgan
 Dulijan